John F Kennedy Catholic School is a voluntary aided Roman Catholic comprehensive secondary school located in Hemel Hempstead, Hertfordshire, England. It opened in 1967 and has a current student population of approximately 1,100, aged 11 to 18. The school's motto is Pacem in terris (peace on Earth).

The school is also part of a local partnership of secondary schools, offering a variety of subject choices for post-16 students, but as of 2020, this partnership is more limited.

In September 2009, the school opened a major £8.4m ($16.2m) new building project which has expanded facilities for several of the school's subject departments.
The building project includes:
 A new teaching block, taking up part of the area where the school's current tennis courts used to be
 4 new tennis courts on currently unused field area
 A new sports hall in the 'spinney' (a wooded area on the school site)
 A new playground in front of the school's largest teaching block, the 'B Block'
 A new car park to help deal with local parking issues, which will take up the remainder of the current tennis court area
The school has minimised the impact on the local environment by avoiding significant loss of trees. The project also involved the planting of new trees, and using trees which are required to be cut down as wood-chip paths and for the construction of the gazebo-type structure in the so-called 'spinney'.

Achievements and recognition
The school gained Technology College status in 1998, has received Ofsted inspection reports describing it as "outstanding", and appeared on Ofsted's "honours list". It has also received the following special recognitions:

 Schools Curriculum Award 2000
 Investor in People

References

External links
Official website

1967 establishments in England
Buildings and monuments honouring American presidents in the United Kingdom
Educational institutions established in 1967
Catholic secondary schools in the Archdiocese of Westminster
Schools in Hemel Hempstead
Secondary schools in Hertfordshire
Voluntary aided schools in England